Euspira presubplicata is a species of predatory sea snail, a marine gastropod mollusk in the family Naticidae, the moon snails.

Description
The length of the shell attains 14.9 mm.

Distribution
This marine species occurs off Portugal.

References

 Bouchet P. & Warén A. (1993). Revision of the Northeast Atlantic bathyal and abyssal Mesogastropoda. Bollettino Malacologico supplemento 3: 579-840
 Gofas, S.; Le Renard, J.; Bouchet, P. (2001). Mollusca. in: Costello, M.J. et al. (eds), European Register of Marine Species: a check-list of the marine species in Europe and a bibliography of guides to their identification. Patrimoines Naturels. 50: 180-213.

External links

Naticidae
Gastropods described in 1993